Chargesheet is a Bollywood crime thriller drama film directed by veteran Dev Anand, starring Dev Anand, Jackie Shroff, Naseeruddin Shah and Divya Dutta in lead roles, while Riya Sen appears in an item-number and featuring debut of Devshi Khanduri and Kabbir in a negative role. The film is named after a formal document of accusation prepared by a law-enforcement agency in India. 

It was Dev Anand's last movie before he died on 3 December 2011.

Synopsis
The film is loosely based on the death of the late Divya Bharti and the mystery surrounding it, as even today the circumstances of her death are unknown. It also focuses on the criminal life of common people.

Cast 
 kabbir as Inspector Nazeem khan
 Dev Anand as Gambhir Singh
 Naseeruddin Shah as Sultan
 Jackie Shroff as Mahesh
 Divya Dutta as Mini
 Milind Gunaji as Jimmy
 Yashpal Sharma as Suraj
 Shehzad Khan as Marian
 Devshi Khanduri as Cham Cham (debut)
 Riya Sen as Special Appearance in Item number

Soundtrack

References

External links 
 Chargesheet at Bollywood Hungama
 

Films directed by Dev Anand
2010s Hindi-language films
Warner Bros. films